

328001–328100 

|-bgcolor=#f2f2f2
| colspan=4 align=center | 
|}

328101–328200 

|-bgcolor=#f2f2f2
| colspan=4 align=center | 
|}

328201–328300 

|-bgcolor=#f2f2f2
| colspan=4 align=center | 
|}

328301–328400 

|-id=305
| 328305 Jackmcdevitt || 2008 HY || Jack McDevitt (born 1935), an American science fiction author. || 
|}

328401–328500 

|-id=432
| 328432 Thomasposch ||  || Thomas Posch (1974–2019) was an Austrian astronomer of the University of Vienna, who contributed significantly to the study of circumstellar dust properties, natural philosophy, and the history of astronomy. His work for the protection of the night sky and the promotion of astronomy made him well known in Austria and abroad. || 
|-id=477
| 328477 Eckstein ||  || Hartmut Eckstein (born 1954), an experienced astrophotographer at the Starkenburg Observatory. || 
|}

328501–328600 

|-id=563
| 328563 Mosplanetarium ||  || Moscow Planetarium, the oldest planetarium in Europe, which celebrated its 85th anniversary in 2014. || 
|}

328601–328700 

|-bgcolor=#f2f2f2
| colspan=4 align=center | 
|}

328701–328800 

|-bgcolor=#f2f2f2
| colspan=4 align=center | 
|}

328801–328900 

|-id=870
| 328870 Danabarbato ||  || Dana Barbato (born 1967) is a NYC science teacher and known local nature photographer. Her efforts have attracted many young folks into the sciences. She has traveled world wide, and her nature images have appeared in the local newspaper, calendars and Fodor's Safari Guidei. || 
|}

328901–329000 

|-bgcolor=#f2f2f2
| colspan=4 align=center | 
|}

References 

328001-329000